Hadaa Sendoo (born October 24, 1961) is a Mongolian poet and translator. He is the founder of the World Poetry Almanac. In 2006, he established the World Poetry Almanac.  His early poetry was influenced by the Mongolian epic, Russian imagist poetry, and Italian hermetic poetry of the 20th century.

Roots

Hadaa Sendoo was born in 1961 in Southern Mongolia, today's Inner Mongolia, and grew up in Shiiliigool. His father was the head of a theatre, and his mother was a drama actor. Sendoo has lived in Ulan Bator, the capital of Mongolia, since 1991.

Early years

When Hadaa Sendoo was very young, his father moved his family to southern Mongolia, near the Dalan Har Mountains, where Hadaa spent his childhood. He studied old Mongolian and also Chinese at the local high school, but tired of the school curriculum, he later returned to the steppe for a nomadic life until 1984, when his father recommended that he should enter an art institute, where he soon served as an editorial assistant. 

The young Hadaa has had the opportunity to read a lot of Mongolian literature - certainly the classics, and thus epics, including the Jangar, Books of Mongolian Folk Songs, and also Modernist Poetry (Shuleg). 

In 1989, he published his first collection of poems The Nomadic Songs and Moonlight.

In 1991, he moved to Northern Mongolia and ever since has lived in Ulaanbaatar, the capital of Mongolia, where he teaches at the university as a professor of literature, and did research on Mongolian folk literature, including folk songs, and in Mongolian mythology. 

In 1996, Hadaa Sendoo published his first collection of poems written in Cyrillic new Mongolian. In 1998, He joined the Mongolian Writers Union. In 1999, Hadaa and his friends co-founded a cultural magazine called The World's Mongolians (a Mongolian - English bilingual edition) that is published in Mongolia. In the summer of the same year, Hadaa and his bosom friend S. Tserendorj, who is also a Mongolian poet, organized the first Asian Poetry Festival in Ulaanbaatar. 

Hadaa has won the Athens City Hall Prize and the 2nd Olympics of Culture Prize (Athens,1999).

He has taught at the National University of Mongolia.

On the way to poetry

In his middle age, Hadaa Sendoo wrote many poems.

On September 24, 2011, Hadaa joined the World Poetry Movement and thus became one of its earliest members who were founding the World Poetry Movement.

In 2012, He was invited to the largest poetry festival ever staged in the UK, the Southbank Centre's Poetry Parnassus, where he read his poetry and discussed his work as part of the festival. His latest collection of poems was displayed as part of the exhibition in the outdoor spaces around the Royal Festival Hall and the Queen Elizabeth Hall. One of his poems was printed on bookmarks for the "Rain of Poems", and thus was among the poems dropped from a helicopter over London.

His poems have appeared in the World Record Anthology by Bloodaxe. And also in an anthology of present-day Best Poems of 60 representative poets around the globe. 

His poems, translated into more than 40 languages, have been included in The Best Mongolian Poetry.

Hadaa Sendoo is currently a consulting editor of the International Literary Quarterly.

Poets talking about poetry of Hadaa Sendoo

Cambridge University Professor and Poet Richard Berengarten wrote about one of Hadaa Sendoo's works: "I have read this book through carefully.  More important, I was delighted to discover the depth and breadth of his great vision. This impression of mine was strengthened when I read the last prose text on the "Poet of the 21st century" in the bool Come Back to Earth, and his poem "The Wind". Both these texts connect with my concept of the "universalist poet" and "universalist poetry". The theme of the wind (air, breath, spirit) is a very profound one. The poems in Come Back to Earth gave me a sense of the wide spaces of Mongolia and also made me sad for the culture that has been lost. They reminded me of the fine movies The Cave of the Yellow Dog and Story of the Weeping Camel. "

Germany's writer  said: "The poems of the Mongolian poet Hadaa Sendoo give an insight into a little-known area of literary geography."

Germany's Andreas Weiland, an art critic, said: "Hadaa Sendoo's poetry echoes his life, nature, the wide land, the wind of Mongolia. I try to listen to the rhythm. I pay attention to the poetic quality of each line. I think that lines in his poetry like "resigned to another death" or "glad to die another death" both refer to reincarnation. We die so many deaths, because we are reborn, according to Shamanist and Buddhist (and other) beliefs. His poems touch my heart and evoke thoughts and strong emotions, intense images. I think highly of Hadaa Sendoo as a sensitive and real poet".

Influence exerted

He was invited to the influential International Poetry Festival of Medellin as a guest, and also to the 2011 Tokyo Poetry Festival.  In 2012, he took part in the UK's largest ever poetry festival Poetry Parnassus  .

In October 2006, an international poetry yearbook was published in Central Asia, founded by Hadaa Sendoo. .

Hadaa Sendoo, has been recognized as аn accomplished Leader of influence (American Biographical Institute, 2010)

In 2016, Hadaa Sendoo published his collection of poems Sweet Smell of Grass (بوی شیرین چمن) in Persian. This collection of poems has been featured and discussed in the internationally renowned Tehran International Book Fair. And in 2017, Hadaa Sendoo's poetry book,"Wenn ich sterbe, werde ich träumen"(Bilingual Mongolian-German), has appeared in the Frankfurt Book FairFrankfurt Book Fair and poetry book,"Sich zuhause fühlen"(German version), has appeared in the Frankfurt Book Fair 2018, in Germany.

In 2017, Hadaa Sendoo received the award at the Festival DOOS-2017 for "The Manifesto of the five continents”, in Moscow, Russia.

In 2018, Hadaa Sendoo has won award of the third Eurasian Literary Festival in Sochi (Silver medal). And Hadaa Sendoo's poetry book, "Peace, broken heart" (in Russian) has been collected in the Pushkin Library in Sochi.

In 2019, Hadaa Sendoo was invited to the Vietnam International Poetry Festival, the International Writers Forum in Almaty, Kazakhstan, and the Eurasian Literary Festival in Baku, Azerbaijan, where he won the highest honor - winner of the gold medalist of the Silk Way Literary Festival.

Awards

 The Poet of the Millennium Award (2000);
 World Poetry Prize for Distinguished Poet (2005);
 The Mongolian Writers Union Prize (2009);
 The Pinnacle of Achievement Award for poetry (2011);
 Visionary Poet Award (2015);
 Poetry prize of DOOS group (2017);
 The Highest Award of the Eurasian- All-Russian Literary Festival (2018);
 Matthew Arnold Award (2018);
 World Union of Writers Award (2019);
 World Icon of Peace Award (2019);
 Modern Literary Renaissance Award (2019);
 Silk Way prize (2019);
 Nosside World Poetry Prize (2019)

Works

 Poetry Books: The Nomadic Songs and Moonlight (Chinese 1989);
 Rock Song (Mongolian 1996);
 The Steppe (Mongolian 2005);
 Come Back to Earth (English 2009);
 Come Back to Earth (Hui gui da di, Chinese Translation 2010);
 Yurt (Georgian, 2010);
 The Road Is Not Completed (Mongolian, 2011)
 Sweet Smell of Grass (بوی شیرین چمن Persian, 2016)
 Aurora (Kurdish,2017)
 Mongolian Long Song (Georgian, 2017)
 Wenn ich sterbe, werde ich träumen（bilingual Mongolian/German,2017）
 Mongolian Blue Spots / Mongoolse Blauwe Plekken (bilingual English/Dutch, 2018)
 A Corner of the Earth / Eit hjørne på jorda（bilingual English/Norwegian, 2018）
 Мир, разбитое сердце (Russian,2018)
 Sich zuhause fühlen(German,2018)
 Mongolischer blauer Fleck (German,2019)

In Bengali 
Some of the works has been translated in Bengali Language.

 Hadaa Sendoo'r Kobita (হাদা সেন্দো'র করিতা) Translated by Annanta Uzzal

External links

Hadaa Sendoo Official website at The International Literary Quarterly
Original Mongolian poems in English from The Center for Central Asian Literatures in Translation, US
Poems in Mongolian-EnglishStreet Voice issue:Spring 2015 (A non-commercial, multi-lingual literary journal based in Europe).
Mongolian poem in Mongolian cyrillic scriptl at Poetic Souls
PROMETEO, Número 88-89. Julio de 2011 Poems in Spanish
The Chinese Southern Art Poems in Chinese
翻訳詩のコーナー Poems in Japanese
Poeta Hadaa Sendoo, Pro Esia,3 de janeiro de 2013 Poem in Portuguese
NORD LITERAR (105) FEBR 2012, România  poems in Romanian
Magazine Art et Poésie De Touraine -№ 194-Automne 2008  Poem in French
Hadaa Sendoo Poems in Italian
itü sözlük inanna salome 11.02.2013 Poems in Turkish
Edisi Sabtu, 30 April 2011 Poems in Indonesian
Хадаа Сендоо,ПОэтов 2011 Poems in Russian
Fixpoetry 2018 Poem in German - Mongolian
Astana, 2018 Poem in Kazakh
Хадаа Сендўў Poems in Tajik
Barbarus, The Netherlands，2018 Poem in Dutch

References

Mongolian poets
1961 births
Mongolian translators
Living people
20th-century Mongolian poets
21st-century Mongolian poets